Drumelzier Law is a hill in the Manor Hills range, part of the Southern Uplands of Scotland. It is often ascended from Drumelzier itself or Stanhope farm to the west, but ascents from the Manor Valley to the east are also common.

References

Mountains and hills of the Scottish Borders
Mountains and hills of the Southern Uplands
Donald mountains